This is a list of the bird species recorded in Macau. The avifauna of Macau include a total of 416 species, of which 6 have been introduced by humans. 

This list's taxonomic treatment (designation and sequence of orders, families and species) and nomenclature (common and scientific names) follow the conventions of The Clements Checklist of Birds of the World, 2022 edition. The family accounts at the beginning of each heading reflect this taxonomy, as do the species counts found in each family account. Introduced species are included in the total count for Macau.

The following tag has been used to highlight introduced species. The commonly occurring native species are untagged.

 (A) Accidental - a species that rarely or accidentally occurs in Macau
(I) Introduced - a species introduced to Macau as a consequence, direct or indirect, of human actions

Ducks, geese, and waterfowl
Order: AnseriformesFamily: Anatidae

The family Anatidae includes the ducks and most duck-like waterfowl, such as geese and swans. These birds are adapted to an aquatic existence with webbed feet, flattened bills, and feathers that are excellent at shedding water due to an oily coating.

Lesser whistling-duck, Dendrocygna javanica
Graylag goose, Anser anser
Ruddy shelduck, Tadorna ferruginea
Common shelduck, Tadorna tadorna
Garganey, Spatula querquedula
Northern shoveler, Spatula clypeata
Gadwall, Mareca strepera
Eurasian wigeon, Mareca penelope
Eastern spot-billed duck, Anas zonorhyncha
Mallard, Anas platyrhynchos
Northern pintail, Anas acuta
Green-winged teal, Anas crecca
Common pochard, Aythya ferina
Tufted duck, Aythya fuligula
Common goldeneye, Bucephala clangula

Pheasants, grouse, and allies
Order: GalliformesFamily: Phasianidae

The Phasianidae are a family of terrestrial birds which consists of quails, partridges, snowcocks, francolins, spurfowls, tragopans, monals, pheasants, peafowls and jungle fowls. In general, they are plump (although they vary in size) and have broad, relatively short wings.

Ring-necked pheasant, Phasianus colchicus
Red junglefowl, Gallus gallus
Chinese francolin, Francolinus pintadeanus
Japanese quail, Coturnix japonica (A)

Flamingos
Order: PhoenicopteriformesFamily: Phoenicopteridae

Flamingos filter-feed on shellfish and algae. Their oddly shaped beaks are specially adapted to separate mud and silt from the food they consume and, uniquely, are used upside-down.

Greater flamingo, Phoenicopterus roseus (I)

Grebes
Order: PodicipediformesFamily: Podicipedidae

Grebes are small to medium-large freshwater diving birds. They have lobed toes and are excellent swimmers and divers. However, they have their feet placed far back on the body, making them quite ungainly on land. 

Little grebe, Tachybaptus ruficollis
Great crested grebe, Podiceps cristatus
Eared grebe, Podiceps nigricollis

Pigeons and doves
Order: ColumbiformesFamily: Columbidae

Pigeons and doves are stout-bodied birds with short necks and short slender bills with a fleshy cere.

Rock pigeon, Columba livia
Oriental turtle-dove, Streptopelia orientalis
Eurasian collared-dove, Streptopelia decaocto
Red collared-dove, Streptopelia tranquebarica
Spotted dove, Streptopelia chinensis
Barred cuckoo-dove, Macropygia unchall (A)
Asian emerald dove, 	Chalcophaps indica
White-bellied green-pigeon, Treron sieboldii

Cuckoos
Order: CuculiformesFamily: Cuculidae

The family Cuculidae includes cuckoos, roadrunners and anis. These are birds of variable sizes with slender bodies, long tails and strong legs. 

Greater coucal, Centropus sinensis
Lesser coucal, Centropus bengalensis
Green-billed malkoha, Phaenicophaeus tristis
Chestnut-winged cuckoo, Clamator coromandus
Asian koel, Eudynamys scolopaceus
Asian emerald cuckoo, Chrysococcyx maculatus
Plaintive cuckoo, Cacomantis merulinus
Square-tailed drongo-cuckoo, Surniculus lugubris (A)
Large hawk-cuckoo, Hierococcyx sparverioides
Northern hawk-cuckoo, Hierococcyx hyperythrus
Hodgson's hawk-cuckoo, Hierococcyx nisicolor
Lesser cuckoo, Cuculus poliocephalus
Indian cuckoo, Cuculus micropterus
Common cuckoo, Cuculus canorus
Oriental cuckoo, Cuculus optatus

Nightjars and allies
Order: CaprimulgiformesFamily: Caprimulgidae

Nightjars are medium-sized nocturnal birds that usually nest on the ground. They have long wings, short legs and very short bills. Most have small feet, of little use for walking, and long pointed wings. Their soft plumage is camouflaged to resemble bark or leaves.

Gray nightjar, Caprimulgus jotaka (A)
Savanna nightjar, Caprimulgus affinis

Swifts
Order: CaprimulgiformesFamily: Apodidae

Swifts are small birds which spend the majority of their lives flying. These birds have very short legs and never settle voluntarily on the ground, perching instead only on vertical surfaces. Many swifts have long swept-back wings which resemble a crescent or boomerang.

White-throated needletail, Hirundapus caudacutus
Himalayan swiftlet, Aerodramus brevirostris
Pacific swift, Apus pacificus
Little swift, Apus affinis
House swift, Apus nipalensis

Rails, gallinules, and coots
Order: GruiformesFamily: Rallidae

Rallidae is a large family of small to medium-sized birds which includes the rails, crakes, coots and gallinules. Typically they inhabit dense vegetation in damp environments near lakes, swamps or rivers. In general they are shy and secretive birds, making them difficult to observe. Most species have strong legs and long toes which are well adapted to soft uneven surfaces. They tend to have short, rounded wings and to be weak fliers.

Brown-cheeked rail, Rallus indicus
Slaty-breasted rail, Lewinia striata
Eurasian moorhen, Gallinula chloropus
Eurasian coot, Fulica atra
Watercock, Gallicrex cinerea
White-breasted waterhen, Amaurornis phoenicurus
Slaty-legged crake, 	Rallina eurizonoides
Ruddy-breasted crake, Zapornia fusca
Brown crake, Zapornia akool

Cranes
Order: GruiformesFamily: Gruidae

Cranes are large, long-legged and long-necked birds. Unlike the similar-looking but unrelated herons, cranes fly with necks outstretched, not pulled back. Most have elaborate and noisy courting displays or "dances".

Common crane, Grus grus
Red-crowned crane, Grus japonensis

Stilts and avocets
Order: CharadriiformesFamily: Recurvirostridae

Recurvirostridae is a family of large wading birds, which includes the avocets and stilts. The avocets have long legs and long up-curved bills. The stilts have extremely long legs and long, thin, straight bills.

Black-winged stilt, Himantopus himantopus
Pied avocet, Recurvirostra avosetta

Oystercatchers
The oystercatchers are large and noisy plover-like birds, with strong bills used for smashing or prising open molluscs.

Eurasian oystercatcher, Haematopus ostralegus

Plovers and lapwings
Order: CharadriiformesFamily: Charadriidae

The family Charadriidae includes the plovers, dotterels and lapwings. They are small to medium-sized birds with compact bodies, short, thick necks and long, usually pointed, wings. They are found in open country worldwide, mostly in habitats near water.

Black-bellied plover, Pluvialis squatarola
Pacific golden-plover, Pluvialis fulva
Northern lapwing, Vanellus vanellus (A)
Gray-headed lapwing, Vanellus cinereus
Lesser sand-plover, Charadrius mongolus
Greater sand-plover, Charadrius leschenaultii
Kentish plover, Charadrius alexandrinus
White-faced plover, Charadrius dealbatus
Long-billed plover, Charadrius placidus
Little ringed plover, Charadrius dubius
Oriental plover, Charadrius veredus

Painted-snipes
Order: CharadriiformesFamily: Rostratulidae

Painted-snipes are short-legged, long-billed birds similar in shape to the true snipes, but more brightly colored.

Greater painted-snipe, Rostratula benghalensis

Jacanas
Order: CharadriiformesFamily: Jacanidae

The jacanas are a group of tropical waders in the family Jacanidae. They are found throughout the tropics. They are identifiable by their huge feet and claws which enable them to walk on floating vegetation in the shallow lakes that are their preferred habitat.

Pheasant-tailed jacana, Hydrophasianus chirurgus

Sandpipers and allies
Order: CharadriiformesFamily: Scolopacidae

Scolopacidae is a large diverse family of small to medium-sized shorebirds including the sandpipers, curlews, godwits, shanks, tattlers, woodcocks, snipes, dowitchers and phalaropes. The majority of these species eat small invertebrates picked out of the mud or soil. Variation in length of legs and bills enables multiple species to feed in the same habitat, particularly on the coast, without direct competition for food.

Whimbrel, Numenius phaeopus
Eurasian curlew, Numenius arquata
Bar-tailed godwit, Limosa lapponica
Black-tailed godwit, Limosa limosa
Ruddy turnstone, Arenaria interpres
Broad-billed sandpiper, Calidris falcinellus
Sharp-tailed sandpiper, Calidris acuminata
Curlew sandpiper, Calidris ferruginea
Temminck's stint, Calidris temminckii
Long-toed stint, Calidris subminuta
Spoon-billed sandpiper, Calidris pygmaea
Red-necked stint, Calidris ruficollis
Sanderling, Calidris alba
Dunlin, Calidris alpina
Little stint, Calidris minuta (A)
Asian dowitcher, Limnodromus semipalmatus
Eurasian woodcock, Scolopax rusticola
Solitary snipe, Gallinago solitaria
Common snipe, Gallinago gallinago
Pin-tailed snipe, Gallinago stenura
Terek sandpiper, Xenus cinereus
Red-necked phalarope, Phalaropus lobatus
Common sandpiper, Actitis hypoleucos
Green sandpiper, Tringa ochropus
Gray-tailed tattler, Tringa brevipes
Spotted redshank, Tringa erythropus (A)
Common greenshank, Tringa nebularia
Nordmann's greenshank, Tringa guttifer
Marsh sandpiper, Tringa stagnatilis
Wood sandpiper, Tringa glareola
Common redshank, Tringa totanus

Buttonquail
Order: CharadriiformesFamily: Turnicidae

The buttonquail are small, drab, running birds which resemble the true quails. The female is the brighter of the sexes and initiates courtship. The male incubates the eggs and tends the young. 
Small buttonquail, Turnix sylvatica
Yellow-legged buttonquail, Turnix tanki
Barred buttonquail, Turnix suscitator

Pratincoles and coursers
Order: CharadriiformesFamily: Glareolidae

Glareolidae is a family of wading birds comprising the pratincoles, which have short legs, long pointed wings and long forked tails, and the coursers, which have long legs, short wings and long, pointed bills which curve downwards.

Oriental pratincole, Glareola maldivarum

Skuas and jaegers
Order: CharadriiformesFamily: Stercorariidae

The family Stercorariidae are, in general, medium to large birds, typically with gray or brown plumage, often with white markings on the wings. They nest on the ground in temperate and arctic regions and are long-distance migrants.

Pomarine jaeger, Stercorarius pomarinus

Gulls, terns, and skimmers
Order: CharadriiformesFamily: Laridae

Laridae is a family of medium to large seabirds, the gulls, terns, and skimmers. Gulls are typically grey or white, often with black markings on the head or wings. They have stout, longish bills and webbed feet. Terns are a group of generally medium to large seabirds typically with grey or white plumage, often with black markings on the head. Most terns hunt for fish by diving but some pick insects off the surface of fresh water. Terns are generally long-lived birds, with several species known to live in excess of 30 years.

Saunders's gull, Chroicocephalus saundersi
Black-headed gull, Chroicocephalus ridibundus
Brown-headed gull, Chroicocephalus brunnicephalus
Black-tailed gull, Larus crassirostris
Herring gull, Larus argentatus
Lesser black-backed gull, Larus fuscus
White tern, Gygis alba
Sooty tern, Onychoprion fuscatus
Gull-billed tern, Gelochelidon nilotica
Caspian tern, Hydroprogne caspia
White-winged tern, Chlidonias leucopterus (A)
Whiskered tern, Chlidonias hybrida
Black-naped tern, Sterna sumatrana
Great crested tern, Thalasseus bergii

Southern storm-petrels
Order: ProcellariiformesFamily: Oceanitidae

The southern storm-petrels are relatives of the petrels and are the smallest seabirds. They feed on planktonic crustaceans and small fish picked from the surface, typically while hovering. The flight is fluttering and sometimes bat-like.

White-bellied storm-petrel, Fregetta grallaria

Northern storm-petrels
Order: ProcellariiformesFamily: Hydrobatidae

The northern storm-petrels are relatives of the petrels and are the smallest seabirds. They feed on planktonic crustaceans and small fish picked from the surface, typically while hovering. The flight is fluttering and sometimes bat-like.

Swinhoe's storm-petrel, Hydrobates monorhis

Shearwaters and petrels
Order: ProcellariiformesFamily: Procellariidae

The procellariids are the main group of medium-sized "true petrels", characterised by united nostrils with medium septum and a long outer functional primary.

Black-winged petrel, Pterodroma nigripennis
Bulwer's petrel, Bulweria bulwerii
Streaked shearwater, Calonectris leucomelas
Wedge-tailed shearwater, Ardenna pacifica

Storks
Order: CiconiiformesFamily: Ciconiidae

Storks are large, long-legged, long-necked, wading birds with long, stout bills. Storks are mute, but bill-clattering is an important mode of communication at the nest. Their nests can be large and may be reused for many years. Many species are migratory.

Black stork, Ciconia nigra
Oriental stork, Ciconia boyciana

Frigatebirds
Order: SuliformesFamily: Fregatidae

Frigatebirds are large seabirds usually found over tropical oceans. They are large, black-and-white or completely black, with long wings and deeply forked tails. The males have colored inflatable throat pouches. They do not swim or walk and cannot take off from a flat surface. Having the largest wingspan-to-body-weight ratio of any bird, they are essentially aerial, able to stay aloft for more than a week.

Lesser frigatebird, Fregata ariel 
Great frigatebird, Fregata minor

Boobies and gannets
Order: SuliformesFamily: Sulidae

The sulids comprise the gannets and boobies. Both groups are medium to large coastal seabirds that plunge-dive for fish.

Brown booby, Sula leucogaster

Cormorants and shags
Order: SuliformesFamily: Phalacrocoracidae

Phalacrocoracidae is a family of medium to large coastal, fish-eating seabirds that includes cormorants and shags. Plumage coloration varies, with the majority having mainly dark plumage, some species being black-and-white and a few being colorful.

Great cormorant, Phalacrocorax carbo

Herons, egrets, and bitterns
Order: PelecaniformesFamily: Ardeidae

The family Ardeidae contains the bitterns, herons, and egrets. Herons and egrets are medium to large wading birds with long necks and legs. Bitterns tend to be shorter necked and more wary. Members of Ardeidae fly with their necks retracted, unlike other long-necked birds such as storks, ibises and spoonbills.

Great bittern, Botaurus stellaris
Yellow bittern, Ixobrychus sinensis
Schrenck's bittern, Ixobrychus eurhythmus
Cinnamon bittern, Ixobrychus cinnamomeus
Black bittern, Ixobrychus flavicollis
Gray heron, Ardea cinerea
Purple heron, Ardea purpurea
Great egret, Ardea alba
Intermediate egret, Ardea intermedia
Chinese egret, Egretta eulophotes
Little egret, Egretta garzetta
Pacific reef-heron, Egretta sacra
Cattle egret, Bubulcus ibis
Chinese pond-heron, Ardeola bacchus
Striated heron, Butorides striata
Black-crowned night-heron, Nycticorax nycticorax
Malayan night-heron, Gorsachius melanolophus (A)

Ibises and spoonbills
Order: PelecaniformesFamily: Threskiornithidae

Threskiornithidae is a family of large terrestrial and wading birds which includes the ibises and spoonbills. They have long, broad wings with 11 primary and about 20 secondary feathers. They are strong fliers and despite their size and weight, very capable soarers. 

Black-headed ibis, Threskiornis melanocephalus
Eurasian spoonbill, Platalea leucorodia
Black-faced spoonbill, Platalea minor

Osprey
Order: AccipitriformesFamily: Pandionidae

The family Pandionidae contains only one species, the osprey. The osprey is a medium-large raptor which is a specialist fish-eater with a worldwide distribution.

Osprey, Pandion haliaetus

Hawks, eagles, and kites
Order: AccipitriformesFamily: Accipitridae

Accipitridae is a family of birds of prey and includes the hawks, eagles, kites, harriers, and Old World vultures. These birds have powerful hooked beaks for tearing flesh from their prey, strong legs, powerful talons and keen eyesight.

Black-winged kite, Elanus caeruleus
Oriental honey-buzzard, Pernis ptilorhynchus
Black baza, Aviceda leuphotes
Crested serpent-eagle, Spilornis cheela
Greater spotted eagle, Clanga clanga
Steppe eagle, Aquila nipalensis
Imperial eagle, Aquila heliaca
Golden eagle, Aquila chrysaetos
Bonelli's eagle, Aquila fasciata
Gray-faced buzzard, Butastur indicus
Eastern marsh-harrier, Circus spilonotus
Pied harrier, Circus melanoleucos
Crested goshawk, Accipiter trivirgatus
Chinese sparrowhawk, Accipiter soloensis
Japanese sparrowhawk, Accipiter gularis
Besra, Accipiter virgatus
Eurasian sparrowhawk, Accipiter nisus
Northern goshawk, Accipiter gentilis
Black kite, Milvus migrans
Brahminy kite, Haliastur indus
White-bellied sea-eagle, Haliaeetus leucogaster
Rough-legged hawk, Buteo lagopus
Common buzzard, Buteo buteo
Eastern buzzard, Buteo japonicus

Barn-owls
Order: StrigiformesFamily: Tytonidae

Barn-owls are medium to large owls with large heads and characteristic heart-shaped faces. They have long strong legs with powerful talons. 

Australasian grass-owl, Tyto longimembris
Barn owl, Tyto alba

Owls
Order: StrigiformesFamily: Strigidae

The typical owls are small to large solitary nocturnal birds of prey. They have large forward-facing eyes and ears, a hawk-like beak and a conspicuous circle of feathers around each eye, called a facial disk.

Mountain scops-owl, Otus spilocephalus
Collared scops-owl, Otus lettia
Oriental scops-owl, Otus sunia
Eurasian eagle-owl, Bubo bubo
Brown fish-owl, Ketupa zeylonensis
Tawny fish-owl, Ketupa flavipes
Asian barred owlet, 	Glaucidium cuculoides
Brown wood-owl, Strix leptogrammica
Long-eared owl, Asio otus
Short-eared owl, Asio flammeus (A)
Brown boobook, Ninox scutulata
Northern boobook, Ninox japonica

Trogons
Order: TrogoniformesFamily: Trogonidae

The family Trogonidae includes trogons and quetzals. Found in tropical woodlands worldwide, they feed on insects and fruit, and their broad bills and weak legs reflect their diet and arboreal habits. Although their flight is fast, they are reluctant to fly any distance. Trogons have soft, often colorful, feathers with distinctive male and female plumage.

Red-headed trogon, Harpactes erythrocephalus

Hoopoes
Order: BucerotiformesFamily: Upupidae

Hoopoes have black, white and orangey-pink colouring with a large erectile crest on their head. 

Eurasian hoopoe, Upupa epops

Kingfishers
Order: CoraciiformesFamily: Alcedinidae

Kingfishers are medium-sized birds with large heads, long, pointed bills, short legs and stubby tails.

Common kingfisher, Alcedo atthis
Ruddy kingfisher, Halcyon coromanda
White-throated kingfisher, Halcyon smyrnensis
Black-capped kingfisher, Halcyon pileata
Crested kingfisher, Megaceryle lugubris
Pied kingfisher, Ceryle rudis

Bee-eaters
Order: CoraciiformesFamily: Meropidae

The bee-eaters are a group of near passerine birds in the family Meropidae. Most species are found in Africa but others occur in southern Europe, Madagascar, Australia and New Guinea. They are characterized by richly colored plumage, slender bodies and usually elongated central tail feathers. All are colorful and have long downturned bills and pointed wings, which give them a swallow-like appearance when seen from afar.

Blue-throated bee-eater, Merops viridis
Blue-tailed bee-eater, Merops philippinus

Rollers
Order: CoraciiformesFamily: Coraciidae

Rollers resemble crows in size and build, but are more closely related to the kingfishers and bee-eaters. They share the colourful appearance of those groups, with blues and browns predominating. The two inner front toes are connected, but the outer toe is not. 

Dollarbird, Eurystomus orientalis

Asian barbets
Order: PiciformesFamily: Megalaimidae

The Asian barbets are plump birds, with short necks and large heads. They get their name from the bristles which fringe their heavy bills. Most species are brightly colored.

Great barbet, Psilopogon virens

Woodpeckers
Order: PiciformesFamily: Picidae

Woodpeckers are small to medium-sized birds with chisel-like beaks, short legs, stiff tails and long tongues used for capturing insects. Some species have feet with two toes pointing forward and two backward, while several species have only three toes. Many woodpeckers have the habit of tapping noisily on tree trunks with their beaks.

Eurasian wryneck, Jynx torquilla
Speckled piculet, Picumnus innominatus

Falcons and caracaras
Order: FalconiformesFamily: Falconidae

Falconidae is a family of diurnal birds of prey. They differ from hawks, eagles and kites in that they kill with their beaks instead of their talons. 

Pied falconet, Microhierax melanoleucos
Eurasian kestrel, Falco tinnunculus
Amur falcon, Falco amurensis
Merlin, Falco columbarius
Eurasian hobby, Falco subbuteo
Oriental hobby, Falco severus
Peregrine falcon, Falco peregrinus

Cockatoos
Order: PsittaciformesFamily:  Cacatuidae

The cockatoos share many features with other parrots including the characteristic curved beak shape and a zygodactyl foot, with two forward toes and two backwards toes. They differ, however in a number of characteristics, including the often spectacular movable headcrest.

Yellow-crested cockatoo, Cacatua sulphurea  (A)

Old World parrots
Order: PsittaciformesFamily: Psittaculidae

Old World parrots are small to large birds with a characteristic curved beak. Their upper mandibles have slight mobility in the joint with the skull and they have a generally erect stance. All parrots are zygodactyl, having the four toes on each foot with two at the front and two at the back.

Rose-ringed parakeet, Psittacula krameri (I)

Pittas
Order: PasseriformesFamily: Pittidae

Pittas are medium-sized by passerine standards and are stocky, with fairly long, strong legs, short tails and stout bills. Many, but not all, are brightly colored. They spend the majority of their time on wet forest floors, eating snails, insects and similar invertebrates.

Fairy pitta, Pitta nympha (A)

Cuckooshrikes
Order: PasseriformesFamily: Campephagidae

The cuckooshrikes are small to medium-sized passerine birds. They are predominantly grayish with white and black, although some species are brightly colored.

Gray-chinned minivet, Pericrocotus solaris
Short-billed minivet, Pericrocotus brevirostris
Scarlet minivet, Pericrocotus flammeus
Ashy minivet, Pericrocotus divaricatus
Brown-rumped minivet, Pericrocotus cantonensis
Large cuckooshrike, Coracina macei
Black-winged cuckooshrike, Coracina melaschistos

Vireos, shrike-babblers, and erpornis
Order: PasseriformesFamily: Vireonidae

Most of the members of this family are found in the New World. However, the shrike-babblers and erpornis, which only slightly resemble the "true" vireos and greenlets, are found in South East Asia.

White-bellied erpornis, Erpornis zantholeuca

Old World orioles
Order: PasseriformesFamily: Oriolidae

The Old World orioles are colorful passerine birds. They are not related to the New World orioles.

Black-naped oriole, Oriolus chinensis

Woodswallows, bellmagpies, and allies
Order: PasseriformesFamily: Artamidae

The woodswallows are soft-plumaged, somber-colored passerine birds. They are smooth, agile flyers with moderately large, semi-triangular wings.

Ashy woodswallow, Artamus fuscus

Vangas, helmetshrikes, and allies
Order: PasseriformesFamily: Vangidae

The family Vangidae is highly variable, though most members of it resemble true shrikes to some degree.

Large woodshrike, Tephrodornis gularis

Drongos
Order: PasseriformesFamily: Dicruridae

The drongos are mostly black or dark grey in colour, sometimes with metallic tints. They have long forked tails, and some Asian species have elaborate tail decorations. They have short legs and sit very upright when perched, like a shrike. They flycatch or take prey from the ground.

Black drongo, Dicrurus macrocercus
Ashy drongo, Dicrurus leucophaeus
Hair-crested drongo, Dicrurus hottentottus

Monarch flycatchers
Order: PasseriformesFamily: Monarchidae

The monarch flycatchers are small to medium-sized insectivorous passerines which hunt by flycatching.

Black-naped monarch, Hypothymis azurea
Japanese paradise-flycatcher, Terpsiphone atrocaudata (A)
Amur paradise-flycatcher, Terpsiphone incei

Shrikes
Order: PasseriformesFamily: Laniidae

Shrikes are passerine birds known for their habit of catching other birds and small animals and impaling the uneaten portions of their bodies on thorns. A typical shrike's beak is hooked, like a bird of prey. 

Tiger shrike, Lanius tigrinus
Bull-headed shrike, Lanius bucephalus
Brown shrike, Lanius cristatus
Burmese shrike, Lanius collurioides
Long-tailed shrike, Lanius schach
Chinese gray shrike, Lanius sphenocercus

Crows, jays, and magpies
Order: PasseriformesFamily: Corvidae

The family Corvidae includes crows, ravens, jays, choughs, magpies, treepies, nutcrackers and ground jays. Corvids are above average in size among the Passeriformes, and some of the larger species show high levels of intelligence.

Eurasian jay, Garrulus glandarius
Azure-winged magpie, Cyanopica cyanus
Red-billed blue-magpie, Urocissa erythrorhyncha
Gray treepie, Dendrocitta formosae
Oriental magpie, Pica serica
Eurasian magpie, Pica pica
Large-billed crow, Corvus macrorhynchos
Collared crow, Corvus torquatus

Fairy flycatchers
Order: PasseriformesFamily: Stenostiridae

Most of the species of this small family are found in Africa, though a few inhabit tropical Asia. They are not closely related to other birds called "flycatchers".

Gray-headed canary-flycatcher, Culicicapa ceylonensis (A)

Tits, chickadees, and titmice
Order: PasseriformesFamily: Paridae

The Paridae are mainly small stocky woodland species with short stout bills. Some have crests. They are adaptable birds, with a mixed diet including seeds and insects.

Japanese tit, Parus minor
Yellow-cheeked tit, Machlolophus spilonotus

Penduline-tits
Order: PasseriformesFamily: Remizidae

The penduline-tits are a group of small passerine birds related to the true tits. They are insectivores.

Chinese penduline-tit, Remiz consobrinus

Larks
Order: PasseriformesFamily: Alaudidae

Larks are small terrestrial birds with often extravagant songs and display flights. Most larks are fairly dull in appearance. Their food is insects and seeds.

Oriental skylark, Alauda gulgula

Cisticolas and allies
Order: PasseriformesFamily: Cisticolidae

The Cisticolidae are warblers found mainly in warmer southern regions of the Old World. They are generally very small birds of drab brown or grey appearance found in open country such as grassland or scrub.

Common tailorbird, Orthotomus sutorius
Yellow-bellied prinia, Prinia flaviventris
Plain prinia, Prinia inornata
Zitting cisticola, Cisticola juncidis
Golden-headed cisticola, Cisticola exilis

Reed warblers and allies 
Order: PasseriformesFamily: Acrocephalidae

The members of this family are usually rather large for "warblers". Most are rather plain olivaceous brown above with much yellow to beige below. They are usually found in open woodland, reedbeds, or tall grass. The family occurs mostly in southern to western Eurasia and surroundings, but it also ranges far into the Pacific, with some species in Africa.
 
Thick-billed warbler, Arundinax aedon
Black-browed reed warbler, Acrocephalus bistrigiceps
Oriental reed warbler, Acrocephalus orientalis

Grassbirds and allies
Order: PasseriformesFamily: Locustellidae

Locustellidae are a family of small insectivorous songbirds found mainly in Eurasia, Africa, and the Australian region. They are smallish birds with tails that are usually long and pointed, and tend to be drab brownish or buffy all over.

Pallas's grasshopper warbler, Helopsaltes certhiolaLanceolated warbler, Locustella lanceolata
Russet bush warbler, Locustella mandelli (A)

CupwingsOrder: PasseriformesFamily: Pnoepygidae

The members of this small family are found in mountainous parts of South and South East Asia.

Pygmy cupwing, Pnoepyga pusilla

SwallowsOrder: PasseriformesFamily: Hirundinidae

The family Hirundinidae is adapted to aerial feeding. They have a slender streamlined body, long pointed wings and a short bill with a wide gape. The feet are adapted to perching rather than walking, and the front toes are partially joined at the base.

Barn swallow, Hirundo rustica
Red-rumped swallow, Cecropis daurica
Asian house-martin, Delichon dasypus

BulbulsOrder: PasseriformesFamily: Pycnonotidae

Bulbuls are medium-sized songbirds. Some are colourful with yellow, red or orange vents, cheeks, throats or supercilia, but most are drab, with uniform olive-brown to black plumage. Some species have distinct crests.

Collared finchbill, Spizixos semitorques
Red-vented bulbul, Pycnonotus cafer (I)
Red-whiskered bulbul, Pycnonotus jocosus
Light-vented bulbul, Pycnonotus sinensis
Sooty-headed bulbul, Pycnonotus aurigaster
Black bulbul, Hypsipetes leucocephalus
Chestnut bulbul, Hemixos castanonotus
Mountain bulbul, Ixos mcclellandii

Leaf warblersOrder: PasseriformesFamily''': Phylloscopidae

Leaf warblers are a family of small insectivorous birds found mostly in Eurasia and ranging into Wallacea and Africa. The species are of various sizes, often green-plumaged above and yellow below, or more subdued with greyish-green to greyish-brown colors.

Yellow-browed warbler, Phylloscopus inornatusHume's warbler, Phylloscopus humeiChinese leaf warbler, Phylloscopus yunnanensisPallas's leaf warbler, Phylloscopus proregulusRadde's warbler, Phylloscopus schwarziDusky warbler, Phylloscopus fuscatusEastern crowned warbler, Phylloscopus coronatus'
Bianchi's warbler, Phylloscopus valentini (A)
Martens's warbler, Phylloscopus omeiensis (A)
Alström's warbler, Phylloscopus soror
Two-barred warbler, Phylloscopus plumbeitarsus
Pale-legged leaf warbler, Phylloscopus tenellipes
Sakhalin leaf warbler, Phylloscopus borealoides
Arctic warbler, Phylloscopus borealis
Chestnut-crowned warbler, Phylloscopus castaniceps
Sulphur-breasted warbler, Phylloscopus ricketti (A)
Hartert's leaf warbler, Phylloscopus goodsoni

Bush warblers and allies
Order: PasseriformesFamily: Scotocercidae

The members of this family are found throughout Africa, Asia, and Polynesia. Their taxonomy is in flux, and some authorities place some genera in other families.
 
Asian stubtail, Urosphena squameiceps
Rufous-faced warbler, Abroscopus albogularis
Mountain tailorbird, Phyllergates cuculatus
Manchurian bush warbler, Horornis borealis
Brownish-flanked bush warbler, Horornis fortipes

Sylviid warblers, parrotbills, and allies
Order: PasseriformesFamily: Sylviidae

The family Sylviidae is a group of small insectivorous passerine birds. They mainly occur as breeding species, as the common name implies, in Europe, Asia and, to a lesser extent, Africa. Most are of generally undistinguished appearance, but many have distinctive songs.

Vinous-throated parrotbill, Sinosuthora webbiana

White-eyes, yuhinas, and Allies
Order: PasseriformesFamily: Zosteropidae

The white-eyes are small and mostly undistinguished, their plumage above being generally some dull colour like greenish-olive, but some species have a white or bright yellow throat, breast or lower parts, and several have buff flanks. As their name suggests, many species have a white ring around each eye.

Indochinese yuhina, Staphida torqueola
Chestnut-flanked white-eye, Zosterops erythropleurus
Swinhoe's white-eye, Zosterops simplex

Tree-babblers, scimitar-babblers, and allies
Order: PasseriformesFamily: Timaliidae

The babblers, or timaliids, are somewhat diverse in size and coloration, but are characterized by soft fluffy plumage.

Streak-breasted scimitar-babbler, Pomatorhinus ruficollis

Laughingthrushes and allies
Order: PasseriformesFamily: Leiothrichidae

The members of this family are diverse in size and colouration, though those of genus Turdoides tend to be brown or greyish. The family is found in Africa, India, and southeast Asia.

Huet's fulvetta, Alcippe hueti
Red-billed leiothrix, Leiothrix lutea
Silver-eared mesia, Leiothrix argentauris (A)
Chinese hwamei, Garrulax canorus
Lesser necklaced laughingthrush, Garrulax monileger
Black-throated laughingthrush, Pterorhinus chinensis
Masked laughingthrush, Garrulax perspicillatus
Greater necklaced laughingthrush, Pterorhinus pectoralis

Dippers
Order: PasseriformesFamily: Cinclidae

Dippers are a group of perching birds whose habitat includes aquatic environments in the Americas, Europe and Asia. They are named for their bobbing or dipping movements.

Brown dipper, Cinclus pallasii

Starlings
Order: PasseriformesFamily: Sturnidae

Starlings are small to medium-sized passerine birds. Their flight is strong and direct and they are very gregarious. Their preferred habitat is fairly open country. They eat insects and fruit. Plumage is typically dark with a metallic sheen.

Asian glossy starling, Aplonis panayensis (A)
Common hill myna, Gracula religiosa (I)
Rosy starling, Pastor roseus (A)
Daurian starling, Agropsar sturninus (A)
Black-collared starling, Gracupica nigricollis
White-shouldered starling, Sturnia sinensis
Red-billed starling, Spodiopsar sericeus
White-cheeked starling, Spodiopsar cineraceus
Common myna, Acridotheres tristis (I)
Crested myna, Acridotheres cristatellus

Thrushes and allies
Order: PasseriformesFamily: Turdidae

The thrushes are a group of passerine birds that occur mainly in the Old World. They are plump, soft plumaged, small to medium-sized insectivores or sometimes omnivores, often feeding on the ground. Many have attractive songs.

White's thrush, Zoothera aurea
Siberian thrush, Geokichla sibirica
Orange-headed thrush, Geokichla citrina
Chinese thrush, Geokichla mupinensis (A)
Chinese blackbird, Turdus mandarinus
Japanese thrush, Turdus cardis
Gray-backed thrush, Turdus hortulorum
Eyebrowed thrush, Turdus obscurus
Brown-headed thrush, Turdus chrysolaus
Pale thrush, Turdus pallidus
Dusky thrush, Turdus eunomus (A)
Naumann's thrush, Turdus naumanni (A)

Old World flycatchers
Order: PasseriformesFamily: Muscicapidae

Old World flycatchers are a large group of small passerine birds native to the Old World. They are mainly small arboreal insectivores. The appearance of these birds is highly varied, and most have weak songs and harsh calls.

Gray-streaked flycatcher, Muscicapa griseisticta
Dark-sided flycatcher, Muscicapa sibirica (A)
Ferruginous flycatcher, Muscicapa ferruginea
Asian brown flycatcher, Muscicapa dauurica
Brown-breasted flycatcher, Muscicapa muttui
Oriental magpie-robin, Copsychus saularis
Hainan blue flycatcher, Cyornis hainanus
Hill blue flycatcher, Cyornis whitei
Brown-chested jungle-flycatcher, Cyornis brunneatus
Small niltava, Niltava macgrigoriae
Fujian niltava, Niltava davidi (A)
Blue-and-white flycatcher, Cyanoptila cyanomelana
Verditer flycatcher, Eumyias thalassinus
Lesser shortwing, Brachypteryx leucophris (A)
Rufous-tailed robin, Larvivora sibilans
Japanese robin, Larvivora akahige
Siberian blue robin, Larvivora cyane
Bluethroat, Luscinia svecica
Blue whistling-thrush, Myophonus caeruleus
White-crowned forktail, Enicurus leschenaulti
Spotted forktail, Enicurus maculatus
Siberian rubythroat, Calliope calliope
White-tailed robin, Myiomela leucura (A)
Red-flanked bluetail, Tarsiger cyanurus
Yellow-rumped flycatcher, Ficedula zanthopygia (A)
Green-backed flycatcher, Ficedula elisae 
Narcissus flycatcher, Ficedula narcissina (A)
Ryukyu flycatcher, Ficedula owstoni
Mugimaki flycatcher, Ficedula mugimaki
Slaty-backed  flycatcher, Ficedula erithacus (A)
Rufous-gorgeted flycatcher, Ficedula strophiata (A)
Taiga flycatcher, Ficedula albicilla
Red-breasted flycatcher, Ficedula parva
Blue-fronted redstart, Phoenicurus frontalis
Plumbeous redstart, Phoenicurus fuliginosus
Daurian redstart, Phoenicurus auroreus
White-throated rock-thrush, Monticola gularis
Blue rock-thrush, Monticola solitarius
Amur stonechat, Saxicola stejnegeri
Gray bushchat, Saxicola ferreus

Flowerpeckers
Order: PasseriformesFamily: Dicaeidae

The flowerpeckers are very small, stout, often brightly coloured birds, with short tails, short thick curved bills and tubular tongues. 

Fire-breasted flowerpecker, Dicaeum ignipectus
Scarlet-backed flowerpecker, Dicaeum cruentatum

Sunbirds and spiderhunters
Order: PasseriformesFamily: Nectariniidae

The sunbirds and spiderhunters are very small passerine birds which feed largely on nectar, although they will also take insects, especially when feeding young. Flight is fast and direct on their short wings. Most species can take nectar by hovering like a hummingbird, but usually perch to feed.

Olive-backed sunbird, Cinnyris jugularis
Fork-tailed sunbird, Aethopyga christinae

Leafbirds
Order: PasseriformesFamily: Chloropseidae

The leafbirds are small, bulbul-like birds. The males are brightly plumaged, usually in greens and yellows.

Blue-winged leafbird, Chloropsis cochinchinensis (I) 
Orange-bellied leafbird, Chloropsis hardwickii

Waxbills and allies
Order: PasseriformesFamily: Estrildidae

The estrildid finches are small passerine birds of the Old World tropics and Australasia. They are gregarious and often colonial seed eaters with short, thick but pointed bills. They are all similar in structure and habits, but have wide variation in plumage colours and patterns.

Scaly-breasted munia, Lonchura punctulata
White-rumped munia, Lonchura striata
Chestnut munia, Lonchura atricapilla

Old World sparrows
Order: PasseriformesFamily: Passeridae

Old World sparrows are small passerine birds. In general, sparrows tend to be small, plump, brown or grey birds with short tails and short powerful beaks. Sparrows are seed eaters, but they also consume small insects.

Russet sparrow, Passer cinnamomeus
Eurasian tree sparrow, Passer montanus

Wagtails and pipits
Order: PasseriformesFamily: Motacillidae

Motacillidae is a family of small passerine birds with medium to long tails. They include the wagtails, longclaws and pipits. They are slender, ground feeding insectivores of open country.

Forest wagtail, Dendronanthus indicus (A)
Gray wagtail, Motacilla cinerea
Western yellow wagtail, Motacilla flava
Eastern yellow wagtail, Motacilla tschutschensis
Citrine wagtail, Motacilla citreola
White wagtail, Motacilla alba
Richard's pipit, Anthus richardi
Olive-backed pipit, Anthus hodgsoni
Red-throated pipit, Anthus cervinus (A)

Finches, euphonias, and allies
Order: PasseriformesFamily: Fringillidae

Finches are seed-eating passerine birds, that are small to moderately large and have a strong beak, usually conical and in some species very large. All have twelve tail feathers and nine primaries. These birds have a bouncing flight with alternating bouts of flapping and gliding on closed wings and most sing well.

Yellow-billed grosbeak, Eophona migratoria
Japanese grosbeak, Eophona personata
Common rosefinch, Carpodacus erythrinus
Brown bullfinch, Pyrrhula nipalensis
Oriental greenfinch, Chloris sinica (A)
Eurasian siskin, Spinus spinus

Old World buntings
Order: PasseriformesFamily: Emberizidae

The emberizids are a large family of passerine birds. They are seed-eating birds with distinctively shaped bills. Many emberizid species have distinctive head patterns.

Crested bunting, Emberiza lathami
Chestnut-eared bunting, Emberiza fucata
Yellow-breasted bunting, Emberiza aureola
Little bunting, Emberiza pusilla
Yellow bunting, Emberiza sulphurata
Black-faced bunting, Emberiza spodocephala
Chestnut bunting, Emberiza rutila
Yellow-browed bunting, Emberiza chrysophrys
Tristram's bunting, Emberiza tristrami

See also
List of birds
Lists of birds by region
List of mammals of Macau

References

Macau
Fauna of Macau
Birds
Macau